Harold Temple White (24 December 1881 – 8 September 1972) was a notable New Zealand music teacher, conductor, organist and composer. He was born in Laceby, Lincolnshire, England, in 1881, and resided in Wellington for much of his life.

References

1881 births
1972 deaths
New Zealand classical organists
Male classical organists
New Zealand Methodists
New Zealand music teachers
New Zealand composers
Male composers
English emigrants to New Zealand
People from the Borough of North East Lincolnshire
People from Wellington City
20th-century organists
20th-century male musicians